Southwest Historic District may refer to:

 Southwest Holly Springs Historic District, Holly Springs, MS, listed on the NRHP in Mississippi
 Southwest Historic District (Waltons Store, North Carolina), listed on the NRHP in North Carolina
 Hickory Southwest Downtown Historic District, Hickory, NC, listed on the NRHP in North Carolina
 Southwest Historic District (Roanoke, Virginia), listed on the NRHP in Virginia
 Southwest Mountains Rural Historic District, Keswick, VA, listed on the NRHP in Virginia
 Southwest Virginia Museum Historical State Park, Big Stone Gap, VA, listed on the NRHP in Virginia
 Southwest Historic District (Ripon, Wisconsin), listed on the NRHP in Wisconsin
 Southwest Side Historic District, Stoughton, WI, listed on the NRHP in Wisconsin